Miro Ronac (born 16 October 1961) is a Peruvian athlete. He competed in the men's decathlon at the 1980 Summer Olympics.

References

1961 births
Living people
Athletes (track and field) at the 1980 Summer Olympics
Peruvian decathletes
Olympic athletes of Peru
Place of birth missing (living people)
South American Games silver medalists for Peru
South American Games bronze medalists for Peru
South American Games medalists in athletics
Competitors at the 1978 Southern Cross Games
20th-century Peruvian people